The communauté de communes de Trévières is a former communauté de communes in the Calvados department, in northern France. It was created in January 2000. It was merged into the new Communauté de communes Isigny-Omaha Intercom in January 2017.

The Communauté de communes comprised the following communes:

Aignerville
Asnières-en-Bessin
Bernesq 	
Blay
Bricqueville 	
Colleville-sur-Mer
Colombières 	
Crouay
Écrammeville 	
Étréham
La Folie 	
Formigny
Louvières 	
Maisons
Mandeville-en-Bessin
Mosles 	
Rubercy
Russy 	
Saint-Laurent-sur-Mer 	
Saint-Martin-de-Blagny
Sainte-Honorine-des-Pertes
Surrain 	
Tour-en-Bessin
Trévières 	
Vierville-sur-Mer

References

Trevieres